Ádám Lukács (born 25 June 1996) is a Hungarian ice dancer. With his skating partner, Anna Yanovskaya, he is a three-time Hungarian national champion (2018–19, 2021) and has competed in the final segment at three ISU Championships. With his former skating partner, Carolina Moscheni, he placed 14th at the 2014 World Junior Championships.

Career 
Lukács began learning to skate in 2004. He competed with Szidónia Merkwart in the 2011–12 season.

Partnership with Moscheni 
Lukács teamed up with Italian ice dancer Carolina Moscheni in May 2012. The two were coached by Barbara Fusar-Poli in Milan and by Igor Shpilband in Novi, Michigan.

Moscheni/Lukács began competing internationally for Hungary in the 2013–14 season. They won the 2014 Hungarian national junior title and were sent to the 2014 World Junior Championships in Sofia, Bulgaria. They qualified for the free dance and finished 14th overall.

On 30 August 2015, Moscheni and Lukács announced the end of their partnership. However, seven months later, they announced they decided to continue skating together.

Partnership with Yanovskaya 
In December 2016, Lukács teamed up with Russia's Anna Yanovskaya to compete for Hungary. Making their competitive debut, the duo placed 12th at the Bavarian Open in February 2017.

Programs

With Yanovskaya

With Moscheni

With Merkwart

Competitive highlights 
CS Challenger Series; JGP: Junior Grand Prix

With Yanovskaya

With Moscheni

With Merkwart

References

External links 

 
 

1996 births
Hungarian male ice dancers
Living people
Figure skaters from Budapest